The 2009 Waterford Senior Hurling Championship commenced on 25 April and concluded on 17 October 2009. De La Salle were the defending champions, having beaten Abbeyside in the 2008 final. Ballygunner defeated Lismore in the 2009 final following a replay.  Due to complications with the former structure of the championship in 2008, it had been decided that the 12 teams would be structured into two groups of six.  The top four teams from each group advanced to the quarter final stage, from which the semi-finals and the final were played. The final and replay were played in Walsh Park in October 2009. The teams which finished last in each group played in a relegation playoff match. The losing team, Rinn Ó gCuanach, have been demoted to Intermediate for 2010.

Group A

Standings

Matches

Round 1

Round 2

Round 3

Round 4

Round 5

Group B

Standings

Matches

Round 1

Round 2

Round 3

Round 4

Round 5

Relegation playoff

Knockout stages

Waterford Senior Hurling Championship
Waterford Senior Hurling Championship